Sar (also Romanized as Sār) is a village in Kuh Dasht Rural District, Neyasar District, Kashan County, Isfahan Province, Iran. At the 2014 census, its population was 850 in summer and 150 in winter, in 210 families.

Sar is located in Kashan county and in Isfahan Province in Iran.

Sar is surrounded by mountains and located in a valley.
Sar agricultural productions are walnut, almond, rose and Mohammadi flower, plum, berry and wild berry, cucumber, corn and other fruits.
Sar industry is related to agricultural and honey production and rose-water production and other crafts like carpet production.
Sar has many farms included Hamzer jungle, Lasompa Farm, and Jomalabad Farm, ....
The nearby Hamzer jungle begins from Sar and finished in near of Meshkat village near of Qom - Kashan Highway. In this jungle, wild berry is found in abundance.
Sar is a prominent village in memorizing the Quran in Iran and every year Quran competitions are held in this village. After final competition kids receive awards.

The nature of Sar is covered by buttonwood, willow, walnut and almond trees.
The village has television and mobile coverage and all homes have a landline phone. Streets and alleys are covered by asphalt. 
A river passes through middle of the village and which floats in spring and winter.
Local games include abdeh, pel and chafto, haft sang (7 stone), these games are like the American rugby game.
Soccer and volleyball are popular among youths and every year matches between villages are held in Norouz holiday (20-30 March).

References 

Populated places in Kashan County